Hibbertia eatoniae is a shrub in the family Dilleniaceae family and is endemic to the south-west of Western Australia. It flowers from May to October and produces yellow flowers. It is similar to Hibbertia ancistrophylla but has leaves with short, scale-covered petioles, flowers with peduncles and hairy carpels and to H. lepidocalyx but has smaller leaves. It was first formally described in 1904 by Ludwig Diels in Botanische Jahrbücher für Systematik, Pflanzengeschichte und Pflanzengeographie. The specific epithet (eatoniae) honours Alice Eaton of Youndegin, who collected the type specimens.

See also
List of Hibbertia species

References

eatoniae
Flora of Western Australia
Plants described in 1904
Taxa named by Ludwig Diels